Vanagaram, which is pronounced as Vaanagaram, is a residential neighborhood in  Chennai, Tamil Nadu, in India. It is in North-East of Chennai and the fastest developing parts of the city. It has always been a smart and affluent residential suburb, but more recently Vanagaram has become a busy commercial and educational center as well.

 (In Tamil language), 'Vaan' means 'sky' and 'agaram' means 'the place of God for worshipping/residence'.

Notes and references

Neighbourhoods in Chennai